The following list consists of Dinaric karst fields or polje(s) in Bosnia and Herzegovina:

Poljes (fields)
Western Bosnia:
 Livanjsko Polje
 Duvanjsko Polje
 Kupreško Polje
 Drvarsko polje
 Glamočko Polje
 Grahovsko Polje
 Medno Polje, Bosanski Petrovac

Western Herzegovina:
 Imotsko Polje
 Ljubuško Polje

Eastern Bosnia:
 Dobro Polje

Eastern Herzegovina:
 Nevesinjsko Polje
 Gatačko Polje
 Fatničko Polje
 Dabarsko Polje
 Ljubinsko Polje
 Ljubomir Polje
 Popovo Polje

References

External links
 Journal of Caves and Karst Studies